Real Drive is a 2008 anime TV series created by Production I.G and Masamune Shirow (the latter who is known for being the creator of the Ghost in the Shell franchise), produced in collaboration with broadcaster Nippon Television (NTV). The series revolves around an information network known as "The Metal", and the series centers on Masamichi Haru, a paraphelgic old man who was in a coma for 50 years after a test dive using Meta-Real technology went horribly wrong. After awakening from his coma, he starts searching for the "answer in the sea" with help from Metal diver Souta Aoi and his little sister Minamo, his old friend Eiichiro Kushima, and his android helper Holon.

Real Drive is produced by Production I.G under the directorship of Kazuhiro Furuhashi, with series composition by Junichi Fujisaku, music by Hideki Taniuchi and Yoshihisa Hirano, characters by Tetsuo Ueyama, and produced by Takeshi Wada (Production I.G), Toshio Nakatani (NTV), Yasuo Ueda (Vap), and Yousuke Kasahara. The series aired 26 episodes on NTV from April 8, 2008 to September 30, 2008, with subsequent broadcast runs on GyaO, Sapporo TV, Chūkyō Television Broadcasting, Animax, Fukuoka Broadcasting Corporation, YTV, TV. Shinshu, and Tochigi TV. Thirteen DVD compilation volumes, each containing two episodes, were released by VAP between August 27, 2008 and August 21, 2009, with four DVD "Collector's Boxes" released between August 27, 2009 and May 22, 2009. The Collector's Boxes includes three to four disks, each containing two episodes, along with other bonus material.

The episodes of Real Drive follow a naming scheme, with the translated title above the Japanese title and the English subtitle below, mostly pertaining to the central object or focus of the episode.

Episode list

References

External links
Official site 
Production I.G Site Worklist 
Production I.G Site Worklist English Translation 

 

Real Drive